Wagner College Stadium is a 3,500-seat multi-purpose stadium located on the campus of Wagner College in Staten Island, New York. Opened in 1967, the stadium is used for football, men's lacrosse, women's lacrosse, and track & field. Hameline Field has 400 premium seat back chairs located at midfield. Below the stadium is a field house featuring several locker rooms, a training room, an equipment room, and public facilities. Surrounding the field is a six-lane synthetic track, allowing the college to play host to many major track & field events. The stadium was renovated as part of a $13 million addition to the campus facilities in 1998. In 2006, the stadium's natural grass field was replaced with state-of-the-art FieldTurf, a synthetic grass playing surface.

In 2012, the playing surface was named Hameline Field in honor of long-time athletic director and head football coach Walt Hameline. In 2013, lights were added to the stadium, and the football and women's soccer teams played home night games for the first time.

See also
 List of NCAA Division I FCS football stadiums

References

External links
Wagner College Stadium

American football venues in New York City
Athletics (track and field) venues in New York City
College football venues
College lacrosse venues in the United States
College track and field venues in the United States
College soccer venues in the United States
Lacrosse venues in New York City
Multi-purpose stadiums in the United States
Soccer venues in New York City
Sports venues in Staten Island
Sports venues completed in 1967
1998 Goodwill Games venues
1967 establishments in New York City